RNB may refer to:
 Nankai Broadcasting (Radio Nankai Broadcasting), a broadcasting station in Ehime Prefecture, Japan
 Russian National Library
 RNB Global University, in Bikaner, Rajasthan, India
 "RNB" (song), a song by Young Dolph featuring Megan Thee Stallion from the album Rich Slave (2020)

See also
 R&B, rhythm and blues music